Charles-Maurice Descombes, real name Jean Charles François Maurice, (26  March 1782 – 7 September 1869) was a 19th-century French playwright, theatre critic and writer.

Biography 
François Guizot's private secretary, literary critic, founder, owner, printer, chief editor and director of the Le Camp-volant (1819-1820), the Journal des théâtres, de la littérature et des arts (1820-1823), the Le Coureur des spectacles (1842-1849), he was managing editor of the Courrier des théâtres, de la littérature, des arts, des modes from 12 April 1823 to 14 May 1842 and of the Nouvelles des théâtres, de la littérature et des arts from 13 July 1842 to 17 September 1842.

An author of theoretical works on theater, he showed himself a staunch opponent of the romantic school.

His plays were presented on the most important Parisian stage of his time including the Théâtre de la Porte-Saint-Martin and the Théâtre de l'Impératrice.

He married Geneviève Isabelle Vauvilliers on 8 August 1811.

Works 
1805: Les Consolateurs, comedy in 1 act and in verses
1805: Le Parleur éternel, comedy in 1 act and in verses
1807: Gibraltar, vaudeville in 3 acts
1807: La Cigale et la fourmi, comedy in 1 act and in prose
1807: Les Trois manières, comedy in 1 act and in verses
1810: Le Luxembourg, comédie-tableau, in 1 act, in prose
1818: Le Misanthrope, en opéra-comique, comedy in 1 act, in verses
1822: M. Benoît, ou l'Adoption, historical drama in 3 acts, in prose
1823: La Lettre anonyme, comedy in 1 act and in prose, with Henri Franconi
1823: Le Petit clerc, comédie vaudeville in 1 act, with Paul Auguste Gombault
1832: Esquisse de quelques scènes de l'intérieur de la Bourse, pendant les journées des 28, 29, 30 et 31 juillet dernier
1832: A Louis-Philippe, roi, Charles-Maurice, homme de lettres, pamphlet
1850: La Vérité-Rachel, examen du talent de la première tragédienne du théâtre français
1852: Un grand malheur ! par un rentier à 600 francs
1856: Histoire anecdotique du théâtre, de la littérature et de diverses impressions contemporaines, tirée du coffre d'un journaliste, avec sa vie à tort et à travers, 2 vols.
1859: Le Théâtre-Français, monument et dépendances
1860: 
1863: Feu le Boulevard du Temple, résurrection épistolaire
1864: Tablettes d'un gentilhomme sous Louis XV, faits inédits
1865: Théâtre, histoire, anecdotes, mots, épaves
1868: Poésies diverses, poems

Bibliography 
 Gustave Vapereau, Dictionnaire universel des contemporains, vol.2, 1870, (p. 1233-1234) (read online)
 Paul Ginisty, Anthologie du journalisme du XVIIe siècle à nos jours, 1922, (p. 374)
 Patrick Berthier, Le théâtre au XIXe siècle, 1986, (p. 22)
 Jean-Louis Tamvaco, Ivor Forbes Guest, Les cancans de l'Opéra, 2000, (p. 929)

References

19th-century French journalists
French male journalists
19th-century French dramatists and playwrights
French literary critics
Writers from Paris
1782 births
1869 deaths
19th-century French male writers